The 2001–02 QMJHL season was the 33rd season in the history of the Quebec Major Junior Hockey League. The league inaugurates the Luc Robitaille Trophy for the team that scored the most goals during the regular season. Sixteen teams played 72 games each in the schedule. The Acadie-Bathurst Titan finished first overall in the regular season winning their first Jean Rougeau Trophy since relocating from Laval. The Victoriaville Tigres won their first President's Cup since relocating from Longueuil, by defeating the Acadie-Bathurst Titan in the finals.

Final standings
Note: GP = Games played; W = Wins; L = Losses; T = Ties; OTL = Overtime loss; Pts = Points; GF = Goals for; GA = Goals against

Lebel Conference

Dilio Conference

complete list of standings.

Scoring leaders
Note: GP = Games played; G = Goals; A = Assists; Pts = Points; PIM = Penalty minutes

 complete scoring statistics

Playoffs

All-star teams
First team
 Goaltender - Dany Dallaire, Halifax Mooseheads 
 Left defence - Danny Groulx, Victoriaville Tigres 
 Right defence - David Cloutier, Val-d'Or Foreurs / Cape Breton Screaming Eagles
 Left winger - Charles Linglet, Baie-Comeau Drakkar
 Centreman - Pierre-Marc Bouchard, Chicoutimi Saguenéens 
 Right winger - Jason Pominville, Shawinigan Cataractes 
 Coach - Real Paiement, Acadie-Bathurst Titan

Second team 
 Goaltender - Adam Russo, Acadie-Bathurst Titan 
 Left defence - Mathieu Dumas, Cape Breton Screaming Eagles 
 Right defence - Jean-François David, Shawinigan Cataractes 
 Left winger - Philippe Lacasse, Hull Olympiques 
 Centreman - Yanick Lehoux, Baie-Comeau Drakkar 
 Right winger - Ales Hemsky, Hull Olympiques 
 Coach - Pascal Vincent, Cape Breton Screaming Eagles

Rookie team  
 Goaltender - Jeff Drouin-Deslauriers, Chicoutimi Saguenéens 
 Left defence - Martin Vagner, Hull Olympiques 
 Right defence - Jesse Lane, Hull Olympiques 
 Left winger - Jean-François Jacques, Baie-Comeau Drakkar 
 Centreman - Benoît Mondou, Baie-Comeau Drakkar 
 Right winger - Steve Bernier, Moncton Wildcats
 Coach - Benoit Groulx, Hull Olympiques
 List of First/Second/Rookie team all-stars.

Trophies and awards
Team
President's Cup - Playoff Champions, Victoriaville Tigres
Jean Rougeau Trophy - Regular Season Champions, Acadie-Bathurst Titan
Luc Robitaille Trophy - Team that scored the most goals, Baie-Comeau Drakkar & Shawinigan Cataractes
Robert Lebel Trophy - Team with best GAA, Halifax Mooseheads
Player
Michel Brière Memorial Trophy - Most Valuable Player, Pierre-Marc Bouchard, Chicoutimi Saguenéens
Jean Béliveau Trophy - Top Scorer, Pierre-Marc Bouchard, Chicoutimi Saguenéens
Guy Lafleur Trophy - Playoff MVP, Danny Groulx, Victoriaville Tigres    
Telus Cup – Offensive - Offensive Player of the Year, Pierre-Marc Bouchard, Chicoutimi Saguenéens
Telus Cup – Defensive - Defensive Player of the Year, Eric Lafrance, Hull Olympiques & Jean-Francois David, Drummondville Voltigeurs
AutoPro Plaque - Best plus/minus total, Jonathan Bellemare, Shawinigan Cataractes 
Philips Plaque - Best faceoff percentage, Pierre-Luc Emond, Cape Breton Screaming Eagles
Jacques Plante Memorial Trophy - Best GAA, Olivier Michaud, Shawinigan Cataractes
Emile Bouchard Trophy - Defenceman of the Year, Danny Groulx, Victoriaville Tigres
Mike Bossy Trophy - Best Pro Prospect, Pierre-Marc Bouchard, Chicoutimi Saguenéens
RDS Cup - Rookie of the Year, Benoit Mondou, Baie-Comeau Drakkar
Michel Bergeron Trophy - Offensive Rookie of the Year, Benoit Mondou, Baie-Comeau Drakkar
Raymond Lagacé Trophy - Defensive Rookie of the Year, Jeff Drouin-Deslauriers, Chicoutimi Saguenéens
Frank J. Selke Memorial Trophy - Most sportsmanlike player, Jason Pominville, Shawinigan Cataractes
QMJHL Humanitarian of the Year - Humanitarian of the Year, Jonathan Bellemare, Shawinigan Cataractes  
Marcel Robert Trophy - Best Scholastic Player, Olivier Michaud, Shawinigan Cataractes
Paul Dumont Trophy - Personality of the Year, Olivier Michaud, Shawinigan Cataractes

Executive
Ron Lapointe Trophy - Coach of the Year, Real Paiement, Acadie-Bathurst Titan       
John Horman Trophy - Executive of the Year, Chicoutimi Saguenéens organization
St-Clair Group Plaque - Marketing Director of the Year, Sylvie Fortier, Baie-Comeau Drakkar

See also
2002 Memorial Cup
2002 NHL Entry Draft
2001–02 OHL season
2001–02 WHL season

References
 Official QMJHL Website
 www.hockeydb.com/

Quebec Major Junior Hockey League seasons
QMJHL